The Belite Superlite, originally the product of Belite Aircraft, is a single-seat, high-wing, single-engine ultralight aircraft developed from the Kitfox Lite aircraft especially for the United States FAR 103 Ultralight Vehicles category.

Design and development
Designer James Wiebe bought the assets and tooling of the Kitfox Lite from Skystar.

The fuselage is made from 4130 steel tubing. Flaperons and vortex generators are used to improve roll control and low speed flight. The wings are foldable for storage.

Items were substituted with carbon-fiber-reinforced polymer to make the aircraft lighter than a Kitfox Lite. This included the tailwheel leaf spring, wing spars, wing ribs (aluminum on later kits), lift struts, firewall, elevator and fuel tank. A variety of engines may be used such as the Hirth F33, Hirth F-23, Zanzottera MZ 34, 1/2 Volkswagen air-cooled engine and the Zanzottera MZ 201.

Variants
254
Superlite
Trike

Specifications (Superlite)

Popular culture
A Belite aircraft was used in the show Mythbusters Episode 174 – Duct Tape Plane.  A Belite was "mauled" by an artificial bear claw with the damage being limited to the fabric skin of the rear fuselage and vertical stabilizer. The control surfaces were not damaged during the destruction. The aircraft was then repaired with Duct-Tape and successfully flown.

Note: This is not to be confused with Speed tape.

References

External links

Homebuilt aircraft